The Delinquents may refer to:
 The Delinquents (1957 film), directed by Robert Altman
 The Delinquents (1960 film), a 1960 Spanish film
 The Delinquents, a 1962 novel by Criena Rohan
 The Delinquents (1976 film), a 1976 Egyptian film directed by Niazi Mustafa
 The Delinquents (1989 film), starring Kylie Minogue
 The Delinquents (Austin Punk Band), U.S. Punk Band
 The Delinquents (group), an American rap group

See also
 Delinquent (disambiguation)